The fourth-seeds Daphne Akhurst and Jim Willard defeated the third seeded Esna Boyd and Gar Hone 6–3, 6–4 in the final, to win the mixed doubles tennis title at the 1924 Australasian Championships.

Seeds

  Meryl O'Hara Wood /  Pat O'Hara Wood (first round)
  Sylvia Lance /  Ian McInnes (semifinals)
  Esna Boyd /  Gar Hone (final)
  Daphne Akhurst /  Jim Willard (champions)

Draw

Draw

References

External links
 Source for seedings

1924 in Australian tennis
Mixed Doubles